The 1928 Wake Forest Demon Deacons football team was an American football team that represented Wake Forest University during the 1928 college football season. In its first and only season under head coach Stan Cofall, the team compiled a 2–6–2 record.

Schedule

References

Wake Forest
Wake Forest Demon Deacons football seasons
Wake Forest Demon Deacons football